Flavia Namakula (born 10 December 1985, other sources report 17 December 1986) is a Ugandan golfer notable for being the youngest winner to-date of the Uganda Women's Golf Tournament. She is also the first Ugandan golfer to win the Kenya Ladies Open. She turned professional in 2016 and as of 2019, she was a five-time winner of the Uganda Ladies Open.

Background and education 
Namakula was born in Rubaga Hospital to Judith Kamale, a nurse. She attended Saint Balikuddembe, Mitala Maria and Bulo Parents Secondary School in Butambala Districtt as well as Gombe Senior Secondary School. In 2006, she enrolled for a degree in Information technology at Makerere University.

Sports and golfing career 
Her first instructor was Deo Akope. She currently tours on the Sunshine Ladies Tour.

Personal life 
Namakula has one daughter.

Career wins

References 

Ugandan female golfers
Makerere University alumni
Sportspeople from Kampala
1980s births
Living people